In Washington, elections are authorized by Articles II, III, and IV of the Washington State Constitution, which respectively include the establishment of elections for the legislative, executive, and judiciary branches of the state government; Article VI establishes election procedures and rights.

Washington uses a vote-by-mail system under the supervision of the Secretary of State, mandated statewide since 2011. Counties were previously able to choose between it and in-person voting from 2005 onward, of which all but one adopted vote-by-mail by 2011.

In a 2020 study, Washington was ranked as the 2nd easiest state for citizens to vote in.

1996
1996 United States presidential election in Washington (state)
1996 Washington gubernatorial election

2000
2000 United States presidential election in Washington (state)
2000 United States Senate election in Washington
2000 Washington gubernatorial election

2002
2002 United States House of Representatives elections in Washington

2004
2004 United States presidential election in Washington (state)
2004 United States Senate election in Washington
2004 United States House of Representatives elections in Washington
2004 Washington gubernatorial election
Washington attorney general election, 2004
Washington secretary of state election, 2004
Washington ballot measures, 2004

2006
2006 United States Senate election in Washington
2006 United States House of Representatives elections in Washington
2006 Washington State local elections

2008
2008 United States presidential election in Washington (state)
2008 United States House of Representatives elections in Washington
2008 Washington gubernatorial election
Washington attorney general election, 2008
Washington secretary of state election, 2008
Washington State local elections, 2008

2009
2009 Washington State local elections
2009 Seattle mayoral election

2010
2010 United States Senate election in Washington
2010 United States House of Representatives elections in Washington

2012

 Presidential (Democratic caucuses, Republican caucuses)
 U.S. Senate
 U.S. House 
 Governor
 Executives
 State Supreme Court
 State Senate
 State House

2013
2013 Seattle mayoral election
2013 Washington's 26th state senate district special election

2014
2014 United States House of Representatives elections in Washington

2016
2016 United States presidential election in Washington (state)
2016 United States Senate election in Washington
2016 United States House of Representatives elections in Washington
2016 Washington gubernatorial election

2017
2017 Seattle mayoral election
2017 Washington's 45th state senate district special election

2018
2018 United States Senate election in Washington
2018 United States House of Representatives elections in Washington

2020

Federal elections 
2020 United States presidential election in Washington (state)
2020 United States House of Representatives elections in Washington

State elections 
 2020 Washington gubernatorial election
 2020 Washington State Senate election
 2020 Washington House of Representatives election

2022

Federal elections 
2022 United States House of Representatives elections in Washington

State elections 
 2022 Washington State Senate election
 2022 Washington House of Representatives election

See also
Political party strength in Washington (state)
United States presidential elections in Washington (state)

References

External links
Elections & Voting at the Washington Secretary of State official website

 

 
Elections
Political events in Washington (state)